Kinesthetics is a 2006 album by keyboardist Scott Kinsey. It features contributions from Tribal Tech bandmates Scott Henderson, Gary Willis and Kirk Covington, as well as Vinnie Colaiuta, Michael Landau and Steve Tavaglione.  Jazz Rock World called Kinesthetics "the best jazz rock fusion CD in the last ten years".

Track listing
"Kinesthetics"  - (Kinsey) - 7:41  
"This Is That"  - (Kinsey) - 4:56  
"Sometimes I..." - (Tavaglione) - 5:02  
"The Combat Zone" - (Kinsey) - 8:13  
"Quartet" - (Kinsey) - 5:36  
"Wishing Tree" - (Kinsey, Tavaglione) - 4:16  
"Big Rock" - (Kinsey) - 4:42  
"Uncle Pats Gypsy Van" - (Kinsey) - 5:10  
"Under Radar (Intro)" - (Covington, Kinsey) - 1:16  
"Under Radar" - (Kinsey) - 5:48  
"Shinjuku" - (Kinsey) - 5:33  
"One for Jinshi" - (Kinsey) - 8:52

Personnel
 Scott Kinsey - Keyboards, Melodica, Producer, Engineer, Vocoder, Mastering, Mixing  
 Scott Henderson - guitar
 Michael Landau - guitar
 Jinshi Ozaki - acoustic guitar
 Steve Tavaglione - saxophone
 Kirk Covington - drums, improvisation
 Cyril Atef - drums, percussion, vox
 Vinnie Colaiuta - drums 
 Gary Willis - bass
 Abraham Laboriel, Sr. - bass
 Armand Sabal-Lecco - bass
 Jimmy Earl - bass
 Robert Hurst III - acoustic bass
 Paul Shihadeh - bass  
 Alex Acuña - percussion
 Arto Tunçboyacıyan - percussion, vox, beer bottle
 Brad Dutz - percussion
 Satnam Ramgotra - tablas
 Tim Hagans - trumpet
 Mamady Keïta - sampled vox, percussion
 Ronald Bruner, Jr. - drums
 Joachim Becker - Executive Producer 
 Cheryl Graul - Photography 
 Joe Zawinul - Executive Producer

References

External links
Abstract Logix site on Kinesthetics
[ Allmusic]
Jazz Rock World review
Kinesthetics all about jazz review

2006 albums
Scott Kinsey albums
Abstract Logix albums